Ganga Nayar (3 August 1923 – 3 April 2009) was a Malaysian politician of Indian descent who founded the Malaysian Workers' Party. She is famously known as the first women to lead a political party in Malaysia. She is also the first Indian woman to be elected to a legislature in Malaysia.

Political career
She joined the Labour Party of Malaya in 1958 at the age of 34 stating that, "Serving with politics and serving without politics is different. When in politics, you can serve with power, more aggressively. Without politics, you serve passively. That's the main reason I went into politics." 

After the Labour Party and the Socialist Front (Malayan Peoples' Socialist Front) were decimated by ISA arrests, she then crossed over to the Parti Gerakan Rakyat Malaysia which was formed ahead of the 1969 elections. 

She rose to become the first chief for the party's women's section. In the 1969 general elections, she stood on a Gerakan ticket for the State seat of Serendah with an electorate of nearly 14,000. Although she was the chairman of Gerakan branch in Sentul, she was pushed to contest in Serendah after negotiations between Gerakan and DAP.

She left the party and joined DAP in 1974. She lost her first bid for a parliamentary seat in Setapak. The following year, while chairperson of DAP's Damansara branch, she quit the party. Nayar founded and led the Worker's Party (nicknamed the Women's Party) in January 1978 as its president. She was the party's lone candidate for the 1978 general election and contested the Sungei Besi parliamentary constituency and the Sungei Way state constituency. She failed to win both seats and lost her election deposits.

The logo of the Workers' Party was the hoe and gear with a dark green background, this echoed the logos of the Labour Party of Malaya and the Socialist Front to which she belonged. The dormant party was taken over by Parti Amanah Negara in 2015.

She retired from politics but still concerned with everyday issues and daily lives of lower group of people.. She once said "I serve individuals, but people keep telling me that this way, I cannot get any titles or any money if I do not join any party and that is a problem with politics today. Politicians no longer serve the people, they serve the party, I am convinced that where there is money politics, not only will the politician fall, the party too will fall."

Personal life
Ganga's father worked as an assistant registrar with the supreme court. He was also famously known as the leader for the Ceylonese Community in Malaya. Her mother served as a teacher. She was married to a freelance journalist, C.V Nayar whom she had 8 children with.

See also

 List of Malaysian politicians of Indian origin

References

1923 births
2009 deaths
Malaysian politicians of Indian descent
Malaysian political party founders
Malaysian socialists
Workers' rights activists
Malaysian women's rights activists
Labour Party of Malaya politicians
Parti Gerakan Rakyat Malaysia politicians
Democratic Action Party (Malaysia) politicians
Members of the Selangor State Legislative Assembly
Women MLAs in Selangor